Lin Liheng (born 31 August 1944) is the daughter of Lin Biao and Ye Qun, nicknamed "Dou Dou" (lit. bean bean) because Lin Biao loved eating beans.

Early life
 
Lin Liheng was born in Yan'an. She went with her father, Lin Biao, to Moscow when she was six years old. In 1962, she joined the Chinese Communist Youth League, and was admitted to the Department of Electronic Engineering of Tsinghua University. She was soon transferred to the Chinese Department of Peking University, due to health reasons. In 1965, she joined the Chinese Communist Party.

Cultural Revolution

During the Cultural Revolution, she served as deputy editor-in-chief of the magazine of People's Liberation Army Air Force.

After Lin Biao died in 1971 in the "Lin Biao Incident" (or "September-13th Incident", 九一三事件), Lin Liheng was investigated and put into custody by the government, even though she was the one that informed Zhou Enlai. In March 1974, during the Criticize Lin, Criticize Confucius campaign, Lin Liheng was characterized by the Gang of Four as "the nail left by Lin Biao". At this time, she was suffering, and even attempted suicide by taking sleeping pills. She was rushed to an Air Force Hospital for medical treatment.  During her interrogation in custody, Lin Liheng lost half of her hair and six of her teeth. However, on Mao Zedong's orders, she was not further interrogated, and was released in 1974. In 1974, a Hong Kong newspaper published a colourful rumour that she had been murdered in revenge for betraying her father.

Post-cultural revolution
 
In October 1975, then Chief of the General Staff of the People's Liberation Army 
Deng Xiaoping proposed to transfer Lin Liheng from the army to local work. She offered to go back to Beijing, but was rejected. Finally, she was arranged to work in an automobile factory in Zhengzhou, as section-level cadre-deputy director of the factory revolution committee. During her time in Zhengzhou, her movements were often restricted by the Ministry of Public Security. Following the fall of Deng Xiaoping in May 1976, Lin's position was downgraded to a factory worker. During the labor in factory, she was injured when she broke her phalanx bone in her right foot. She was to admitted to a hospital on 1984, after suffering from illness and allergies, due to exposure from the pesticide factory near her home.

In the mid-1980s, Lin Liheng wrote a letter of appeal to Zhao Ziyang, then General Secretary of the Communist Party of China, in Beijing. With the help of Lin Biao's old subordinate, Tao Zhu's wife, Zeng Zhi, then deputy head of the Organization Department of the Central Committee, her letter of appeal was submitted. Soon, Zhao Ziyang gave orders which allowed her to be rehabilitated. As a result, Lin Liheng was allowed to return to Beijing.

 
She later went to the Chinese Academy of Social Sciences in Beijing. After returning to Beijing, the couple's lives became comfortable, and as a result Lin Liheng changed her name briefly to avoid public attention. In 1989, she participated in the establishment of an organization called the "Chinese Modern Culture Association", and later established a corporate culture professional committee and an oral history professional committee under this organization. She retired in 2002.

Later life
After retirement, Lin Liheng opened a restaurant in Beijing, serving as its chairperson and general manager. The investment of the restaurant came from her hometown of Huanggang in Hubei Province, and managed to attract a large number of diners from home and abroad.

In 2009, the Museum of the War of Chinese People's Resistance Against Japanese Aggression welcomed more than 80 children of the founding generals to celebrate the founding of People's Republic of China. Lin Liheng also attended the event. In 2011, during the Mid-Autumn Festival, she and her husband led an entourage to Öndörkhaan, the place where her father's plane crashed 40 years ago, for a memorial service honouring him.

On 1 November 2014, she publicly appeared on a symposium of Chinese Red Army descendants and gave speeches; this attracted the media's attention, as she proposed to full respect of historical facts and for intensified efforts to unearth and sort out historical incidents.

See also
Project 571

References

1944 births
People from Yan'an
Living people
Lin Biao family